Zafar is an anti-ship cruise missile developed by Iran.

In response to the United States arms embargo of 1992, Iran turned toward domestically engineered- and produced-weapon systems. The Zafar (Triumph) cruise missile is the result of those efforts. Built to operate in an active electronic warfare environment, it is placed in box canisters which may be mounted on shore-based missile launchers or the small, high speed craft used by the navy of Iran. The Defense Ministry developed the missile. It was revealed to be in active duty in February 2012, having its first successful test fire in April 2011.

Iranian television reported that the missile "is a short-range, anti-ship cruise missile capable of destroying small- and medium-sized targets with high precision."

It has an active radar homing system and maximum range of 25 km.

References

Anti-ship missiles of Iran
Cruise missiles of Iran
Guided missiles of Iran
Anti-ship cruise missiles of Iran
Military equipment introduced in the 2010s